Rina Natan (September 8, 1923 - August 13, 1979) was the first known Israeli transsexual woman.

Biography
Natan was born male on September 8, 1923, in the town of Siegen in Germany, to a wealthy Jewish family. As a child she excelled in music and art. Beginning as a child, she used to wear women's clothing. During World War II, she stayed for a period of time in France, where she learned agriculture. She moved to Palestine in 1946. In Palestine she moved between the Kibbutzes Ma'agan Michael, Ashdot Ya'akov, and Na'an. During the 1948 Arab-Israeli war she served in the army as a paramedic, but after her release she struggled to find a job, and therefore rejoined the army.

In the beginning of 1953, Natan's name made headlines after she was arrested by the police, under suspicions that she was wearing women's clothing for criminal intent. Natan explained to the police officers, as reported by the newspaper Haaretz: "I am a woman in my soul and in my emotions, and only for a physiological error I was born a man". In the years following she returned to the headlines for another arrest by the police, a hunger strike which she did in an endeavor to receive a permit for a gender-reassignment surgery.

Natan claimed initially that she was born with both male and female sexual organs - meaning, she was intersex. Surgeries had already been performed on intersex people in Israel, although in fall 1954 Natan was checked by a committee of doctors who said that she was not intersex.

In her efforts to be permitted to undergo gender reassignment surgery, she began harming herself. A doctor committee on behalf of the ministry of health recommended to comply with her request and allow her to undergo surgery, although the Attorney General of Israel at the time, Haim Cohn, refused the recommendation towards the end of 1954. In the wake of her recurring self-harm, she was reluctantly forced to receive testosterone injections. She resumed her battle, and on May 25, 1956 she arrived to a hospital bleeding and squirming in pain, after she cut her penis. The "Herut" newspaper reported she smiled at the horrified doctors, and said:

Given the danger to her life, the doctors performed the surgery, and Natan became the first transsexual woman in Israel - undergoing sex reassignment surgery out of her own will. Following the surgery Natan received a new ID, in which her name was changed to Rina and her sex was changed to female, although in her passport the sex remained male. In November 1958 she left Israel to Zürich in Switzerland, and disappeared.

See also 
 LGBT history in Israel
 LGBT rights in Israel

Notes

References

Further reading 
 Avner Shapira, "Pioneering Pride: The Unsung Heroes of Israel's LGBT Community", Haaretz, June 6, 2013
 Kristof Steiner, "A timeline of Israel's LGBTQ progression", Timeout, August 30, 2017
 "Transgender History Lesson", from the website "A Wider Bridge"

1923 births
1979 deaths
Transgender Jews
1950s in Israel
LGBT rights in Israel
LGBT history in Israel
Israeli transgender people
German transgender people
Transgender women
Transgender military personnel
Israeli prisoners and detainees
German emigrants to Mandatory Palestine
20th-century Israeli LGBT people